Plostiyevo is a rural locality (a village) in Kichmegnskoye Rural Settlement, Kichmengsko-Gorodetsky District, Vologda Oblast, Russia. The population was 12 as of 2002.

Geography 
Plostiyevo is located 35 km southwest of Kichmengsky Gorodok (the district's administrative centre) by road. Demino is the nearest rural locality.

References 

Rural localities in Kichmengsko-Gorodetsky District